Distensibility is a metric of the stiffness of blood vessels. It is defined as

,

References 

Human physiology